Ivan Atanasov may refer to:

 Ivan Atanasov (ice hockey) (born 1956), Bulgarian ice hockey player
 Ivan Atanasov (weightlifter) (born 1939), Bulgarian weightlifter
 Ivan Atanasov (wrestler) (born 1957), Bulgarian Olympic wrestler